Pseudocucumis may refer to two different genera:
 Pseudocucumis, a synonym for Cladolabes, a genus of sea cucumbers in the family Sclerodactylidae 
 Pseudocucumis, a synonym for Citrullus, a genus of plants